Nils Lahr (born August 1973) is an American entrepreneur, inventor and computer scientist known for his work in the streaming media industry. He founded Synergy Sports Technology and several other companies. He has also been a senior developer at Microsoft.

Early life
Nils Lahr was born in 1973 to John C. Lahr and Karen Ericson. His father was a scientist who worked as a research seismologist in the US Geological Survey from 1971 to 2003. Nils earned his higher education from Menlo-Atherton High School and his Bachelor in Computer Science from New York University Polytechnic School of Engineering. He started programming early at the age of 16 by writing object-oriented databases for the US Geological Survey.

Career
Lahr began his career by working and founding some notable companies in the field of streaming and media, notable among them are;

CNNfn
Lahr worked at CNNfn, a financial news channel when it did the world's first streaming broadcast and built first fully digital studio. He was the webmaster of the team. In 1996, he also said to InfoWorld magazine that the only way for companies to get their content on the internet is through making it easy to find. During his career at CNNfn, he created the first automated stock ticker for TV.

Microsoft
Lahr joined Microsoft in 1996, after leaving CNNfn, and helped as a founding member of its streaming media division. Prior to joining Microsoft he worked for VXtreme and developed streaming media solutions which were later bought by Microsoft and were essential in the development of Windows Media Player and MPEG4.

iBEAM Broadcasting
Lahr co-founded IBEAM Broadcasting Corporation in April, 1998 and later served as it Chief Scientist. From may to July 1999, Nils served as its CTO.

Youbetme
Youbetme is a California based social betting platform, that enables users to bet via their website or their IOS app. It was founded by Jason Neubauer and Justin Jarman in 2011 and the technological services were provided by Nils Lahr, he is also the CTO of the company.
May 2016 OrionsWave was assigned the intellectual property and software of Challenged and YouBetMe.

Synergy Sports Technology, LLC
Lahr is the co-founder and CTO of Synergy Sports Technology, the company provides statistical reports and associated video clips to the NBA coaches and also works for college teams. Nils Lahr develops all the streaming solutions for the company.

LexiconDigital
He worked with David Caruso, around ideas on how to bring production concepts into the digital world sooner for promotional reasons.  They helped influence how some very large and early Hollywood projects promoted themselves online, such as the first and second Iron Man movies.
They had a huge impact in a short time changing how movies used the Internet to promote themselves long before the release date.

Orions Systems

Lahr co-founded Orions Systems

Patents
Lahr has numerous patents spanning in the field of streaming media and content some notable among them are:
 SYSTEMS, METHODS AND ARTICLES TO AUTOMATICALLY EXPOSE AND PLACE MATERIAL IN STREAMS OF PROGRAMMING 
 SYSTEM AND METHOD FOR DISTRIBUTED AND PARALLEL VIDEO EDITING, TAGGING AND INDEXING
 Systems and methods for generating bookmark video fingerprints
 SYSTEM AND METHODS FOR OPTIMIZING BUFFERING HEURISTICS IN MEDIA
 Using a website containing video playlists as input to a download manager
 System and method for rewriting a media resource request and/or response between origin server and client
 Generating Event Definitions Based on Spatial and Relational Relationships
 Method and apparatus for encoder-based distribution of live video and other streaming content
 Automated user activity associated data collection and reporting and content/metadata selection and propagation service
 Peer-to-peer betting systems and methods
 A system and method for determining optimal server in a distributed network for serving content streams
 Method of utilizing a single uniform resource locator for resources with multiple formats
 Method and apparatus for client-side authentication and stream selection in a content distribution system

See also
 Streaming media

References

1973 births
Living people
American computer businesspeople
American computer programmers
American computer scientists
American software engineers
American technology chief executives
American technology company founders
Polytechnic Institute of New York University alumni
21st-century American inventors